Iaso Tholus is a feature on Venus.

References

Surface features of Venus